HMS Thames (N71) was an ocean-going type of submarine of the River Class.  She was built by Vickers Armstrong, Barrow and launched on 26 February 1932. She was completed on 14 September 1932, and after commissioning was assigned to the Mediterranean, stationed at Malta.

Service history
She had a short career in the Second World War.  In August 1939 she was recalled to home waters, and was assigned to 9th Submarine Flotilla with the Home Fleet. From there she undertook interception patrols, searching for German U-boats, surface raiders and blockade runners. After refitting during the winter she was active in the North Sea in spring 1940 during the Norwegian campaign.
In July 1940 Thames torpedoed and sank the German torpedo boat Luchs.  Luchs was part of the escort for the damaged German battleship Gneisenau that was on passage from Trondheim, Norway to Kiel, Germany.

Fate
Thames was reported overdue on 3 August 1940, and had probably struck a mine off Norway in late July or early August 1940.
As HMS Thames was operating from Dundee with the 9th Submarine Flotilla when she was lost, her crew are all commemorated on Dundee International Submarine Memorial.
The crew members are also commemorated at the Royal Navy Submarine Museum.

Commanding Officers
Both of HMS Thames' commanding officers were killed while in command of the vessel.

Cdr Denis V. Sprague RN : 27 December 1939 - 4 July 1940. Killed when trying to take control of the French submarine Surcouf at Plymouth, where it had sought refuge following the French surrender the previous month.
Lt Cdr William D. Dunkerley RN : 4 July - date of loss.

References

 
 GB Mason HMS Thames at naval-history.net

 

River-class submarines
Ships built in Barrow-in-Furness
1932 ships
World War II submarines of the United Kingdom
Ships sunk by mines
Lost submarines of the United Kingdom
World War II shipwrecks in the North Sea
Maritime incidents in July 1940
Ships lost with all hands